The Dream (occasionally also known as Le Songe or Rêve exotique) is a large oil-on-canvas painting created by Henri Rousseau in 1910, one of more than 25 Rousseau paintings with a jungle theme.  His last completed work, it was first exhibited at the Salon des Indépendants from 18 March to 1 May 1910, a few months before his death on 2 September 1910.  Rousseau's earlier works had received a negative reception, but poet and critic Guillaume Apollinaire remarked on its debut: "The picture radiates beauty, that is indisputable. I believe nobody will laugh this year."

The Dream is the largest of the jungle paintings, measuring 6' 8½" × 9' 9½"  (204.5 × 298.5 cm).  It features an almost surreal portrait of Yadwigha (Jadwiga), Rousseau's Polish mistress from his youth, lying naked on a divan to the left of the painting, gazing over a landscape of lush jungle foliage, including lotus flowers, and animals including birds, monkeys, an elephant, a lion and lioness, and a snake.  The stylised forms of the jungle plants are based on Rousseau's observations at the Paris Museum of Natural History and its Jardin des Plantes.   The nude's left arm reaches towards the lions and a black snake charmer who faces the viewer playing his flute, barely visible in the gloom of the jungle under the dim light of the full moon.  A pink-bellied snake slithers through the undergrowth, its sinuous form reflecting the curves of the woman's hips and leg.

Suspecting that some viewers did not understand the painting, Rousseau wrote a poem to accompany it, Inscription pour La Rêve:

One possible interpretation of the painting, offered by Rousseau in a letter to art critic André Dupont, is that it depicts a woman reclining on a couch in Paris, dreaming she is listening to a flute player in the jungle.

The subject of a reclining nude draws from a classical tradition, from Titian’s 1538 painting Venus of Urbino to Manet's 1863 painting Olympia.  Rousseau may have taken some inspiration from Émile Zola's novel Le Rêve, which deals with the love between a painter and an embroideress.  While he was painting The Dream, Rousseau was romantically involved with a shop assistant, Leonie.

French art dealer Ambroise Vollard bought the painting from Rousseau in February 1910.  It was sold through Knoedler Galleries in New York to clothing manufacturer and art collector Sidney Janis in January 1934.  Janis sold the painting to Nelson A. Rockefeller in 1954, who donated it to the Museum of Modern Art, New York to celebrate the Museum's 25th anniversary.  It remains on display at MoMA.

Further reading
 Henri Rousseau: Dreams of the Jungle,  Werner Schmalenbach (2000). Prestel Publishing.  p. 58–59

External links
 Music video of The Dream

References
  Museum of Modern Art
 Provenance, Museum of Modern Art
 Henri Rousseau: Jungles in Paris, National Gallery of Art
 Selected Writings: Poetry of grammar and grammar of poetry, Roman Jakobson, pp. 331–8
 The Lotus Quest, By Mark Griffiths, p. 143
 Personal Places: Perspectives on Informal Art Environments, edited by Daniel Franklin Ward, p. 6

Paintings by Henri Rousseau
Paintings in the collection of the Museum of Modern Art (New York City)
1910 paintings
Nude art
Birds in art
Lions in art
Elephants in art
Musical instruments in art
Snakes in art
Monkeys in art
Moon in art
Paintings of women